The Unholy Rollers is a 1972 American action comedy film directed by Vernon Zimmerman and starring Claudia Jennings.

Plot 
Karen wants more action out of life and quits her job at the cannery to become a skater in the roller derby. She encounters friction from the other skaters—especially Mickey, the current star of the team. Karen proves herself a feisty competitor but refuses to be a team player. As she skates her way to stardom, she incurs the wrath of jealous team members and the owner of the team.

Cast 
Claudia Jennings as Karen Walker
Louis Quinn as Mr. Stern
 Betty Anne Rees as Mickey
Roberta Collins as Jennifer
Alan Vint as Greg
Victor Argo as Vinnie the Trainer
 Candice Roman as Donna
 Jay Varela as Nick
 Charlene Jones as Beverly Brayton
Joe E. Tata as Marshall
 Terry Wolf as grocery boy

External links
 
 
 

1972 films
American action comedy-drama films
1970s exploitation films
1970s English-language films
1970s sports comedy-drama films
Roller derby films
American International Pictures films
1970s action comedy films
American sports comedy-drama films
American action adventure films
1972 comedy films
Films directed by Vernon Zimmerman
1970s American films